This is a list of universities and colleges in Belize.

Belize Adventist Junior College 
Belize Institute of Management
Centro Escolar Mexico Junior College
Corozal Junior College
Galen University - programs at the undergraduate, graduate, and professional level in business, arts and sciences, and education
John Paul II Junior College
Independence Junior College
Muffles Junior College
Sacred Heart Junior College
St. John's College, Belize - programs at the junior college level in business, arts, social, sciences, and education
San Pedro Junior College
Stann Creek Ecumenical Junior College
University of Belize - programs at the undergraduate, graduate, and professional level in business, arts and sciences, and education
University of the West Indies: Open Campus’s activities in Belize, including public service, outreach activities, research and continuing education programming
Wesley Junior College - programs at the junior college level in business and science
Belize Adventist College -  Vision is to prepare young people to be literate, informed, responsible and productive members of a global society who believe in service to others here on this earth while preparing for Christ’s soon return.
Corozal Community College

References

Universities
Belize
Belize